Ahmed Jalal Hassan (born 17 March 1998) is an Iraqi footballer who plays as a midfielder for Naft Al-Basra in the Iraqi Premier League.

International career
On 26 August 2017, Ahmed Jalal made his first international cap with Iraq against Syria in a friendly match.

Honours

Club
Al-Zawraa
Iraq FA Cup: 2018–19

References

External links

1998 births
Living people
Association football midfielders
Iraqi footballers
Iraq international footballers
Al-Shorta SC players
Naft Al-Basra SC players